Juhani Helenius (born 14 May 1933 in Hämeenlinna) is a Finnish sprint canoer who competed in the late 1950s. At the 1956 Summer Olympics, he was disqualified in the heats of the K-2 1000 m event. Four years later in Rome, he was eliminated in the semifinals of the K-1 4 × 500 m event.

References
Sports-reference.com profile

1933 births
Living people
People from Hämeenlinna
Canoeists at the 1956 Summer Olympics
Canoeists at the 1960 Summer Olympics
Finnish male canoeists
Olympic canoeists of Finland
Sportspeople from Kanta-Häme